Cactus World News are an Irish rock band formed in Dublin in April 1984. Founded by Frank Kearns (guitar) and Eoin McEvoy (vocals), the first full stable lineup also included Wayne Sheehy (drums) and Fergal MacAndris (bass). They reformed in 2011 with a new lineup of Kearns, Sheehy and MacAndris, with Eoin Scott and Eoin Watkins. Their early influences were the Clash, Ramones, Talking Heads, U2, the Waterboys and R.E.M.

Career
Their first release, and best known song was "The Bridge", which was produced by U2's Bono, and released on their Mother Records label. They toured the UK with The Cult in 1985 and signed to MCA Records. They performed at the Self Aid concert in Dublin on 17 May 1986. The band  released their debut album, Urban Beaches in 1986 and gained impact hits with its three singles: "Years Later", "Worlds Apart" and a re-recording of "The Bridge". It is a five star album iTunes USA  AllMusic gave Urban Beaches 4.5 out of 5. All three singles reached the UK Singles Chart. After their second album, No Shelter, was shelved in 1989, the band were released from their recording contract and underwent several personnel changes. MacAindris and Sheehy both quit in 1989. McEvoy and Kearns continued for a few more years, with various other band members coming and going, including Chris McGoldrick (bass), John Doyle (bass) and JJ Collier (drums).

In 2010 Kearns played guitar on three songs on the Australian band The Church's album Untitled #23 ("Dead Mans Hand", "On Angel Street", and "Operetta"). Praised for its moody yet strong songwriting, it has yielded some of the Church's best reviews of their career, including a 5 star review from Australia's Rolling Stone. Kearns also contributed guitar to "Love Philtre" on the Church's 2014 album Further/Deeper.

Discography

Albums
Studio albums

Live album
1986 - Live: Spin Magazine Concert Series
Compilation album

 2015 - Found

Singles

References

External links
Official Facebook

Irish new wave musical groups
MCA Records artists
Musical groups from Dublin (city)
Musical groups established in 1984
Musical groups disestablished in 1991
Musical groups reestablished in 2011